Tarso Emi Chi (tarso: "gentle mountain, high plateau"; emi: "large mountain"; named by the Toubou) is a volcano in Chad.

The mountains consist of both a Precambrian crystalline rocks and volcanic rocks.

The volcano consists of a lava plateau that originated in a number of vents, which form a number of volcanic cones. Summits in the volcano include Boubou, Chebedo, Godoon, Kazena Lulli, Kégueur Tédi, Mouskorbé, Tarso Adar, Tarso Aozi, Tarso Chididemi, Tarso Goziydi, Tarso Kozen and Tarso Toudougou.

Tarso Emi Chi has erupted a number of volcanic series such as the "black series" and the "white series", which consist of basaltic andesite, rhyolite and trachyte. Syenite intrusions have been found as well, the black series consist mainly of basalt. The "white series" is usually more heavily eroded than the "black series".

There is no evidence of historical eruptions at Tarso Emi Chi, but volcanic products overlie diatom beds of former lakes.

Vegetation, ice and water 

There is widespread evidence of nivation landforms on Mouskorbe above  and especially above .

Former lakes in Tarso Emi Chi were inhabited by snails such as Euconulus fulvus, Limnea trunculata, Succinea pfeifferi and Zonitoides nitidus, as well as by diatoms, grasses and reeds. Further, Mouskorbe was part of the Kufrah paleoriver watershed; drainages to the east are very steep, north are steep and step-like and drainages to the west are gentler but have still developed deep canyons.

References

Sources 

 
 
 
 

Pleistocene volcanoes
Tibesti Mountains
Volcanoes of Chad